Causeway Coast and Glens Borough Council is a local authority in Northern Ireland that was established on 1 April 2015. It covers most of the northern coast of Northern Ireland and replaced Ballymoney Borough Council, Coleraine Borough Council, Limavady Borough Council and Moyle District Council. The area covered by the council has a population of 140,877 residents as at the 2011 census.

The first elections to the authority were on 22 May 2014 and it acted as a shadow authority, prior to the creation of the Causeway Coast and Glens district on 1 April 2015. There is a Unionist majority on the council.

Mayoralty

Mayor

Deputy Mayor

Councillors
For the purpose of elections the council is divided into seven district electoral areas (DEA):

Seat summary

Councillors by electoral area

† Co-opted to fill a vacancy since the election.‡ New party affiliation since the election.Last update 14 February 2023.

See also 
 Local government in Northern Ireland
 2014 Northern Ireland local elections
 Political make-up of local councils in the United Kingdom

References

District councils of Northern Ireland
Politics of County Antrim
Politics of County Londonderry